Rajapur is a municipality in Bardiya District in Lumbini Province of south-western Nepal. The municipality was established on 18 May 2014 merging the existing Daulatpur, Naya Gaun, Badalpur, Bhimapur, Manpur Tapara and Rajapur village development committees (VDCs). It is located on the border with Uttar Pradesh state, India.  It has a customs checkpoint for goods.  Indian and Nepalese nationals may cross the border without restriction.

At the time of the 1991 Nepal census it had a population of 9,545 and had 1,298 houses in the town.

Demographics
At the time of the 2011 Nepal census, Rajapur Municipality had a population of 59,818. Of these, 77.8% spoke Tharu, 18.5% Nepali, 1.5% Hindi, 0.6% Maithili, 0.4% Sonaha, 0.3% Magar, 0.2% Awadhi, 0.2% Gurung, 0.2% Urdu and 0.3% other languages as their first language.

In terms of ethnicity/caste, 78.6% were Tharu, 5.6% Hill Brahmin, 4.2% Chhetri, 2.9% Kami, 1.5% Thakuri, 1.4% Musalman, 1.2% Damai/Dholi, 1.2% Magar, 0.5% Yadav and 2.9% others.

In terms of religion, 97.0% were Hindu, 1.4% Muslim, 1.3% Christian and 0.4% Buddhist.

References

Populated places in Bardiya District
Nepal municipalities established in 2014
Municipalities in Lumbini Province
Municipalities in Bardiya District